The 1949–50 Minneapolis Lakers season was the second season for the franchise in the National Basketball Association (NBA). The Lakers repeated as NBA Champions, defeating the Syracuse Nationals in six games in the NBA Finals, making it (to date) the only franchise to win the championship in each of its first two NBA seasons.

NBA Draft

Roster

Regular season

Season standings

Record vs. opponents

Game log

Playoffs

|- align="center" bgcolor="#ccffcc"
| 1
| March 21
| @ Rochester
| W 78–76
| George Mikan (35)
| Herm Schaefer (7)
| Edgerton Park Arena
| 1–0
|-

|- align="center" bgcolor="#ccffcc"
| 1
| March 22
| Chicago
| W 85–75
| George Mikan (30)
| George Mikan (3)
| Minneapolis Auditorium
| 1–0
|- align="center" bgcolor="#ccffcc"
| 2
| March 25
| @ Chicago
| W 75–67
| George Mikan (34)
| —
| Chicago Stadium
| 2–0
|-

|- align="center" bgcolor="#ccffcc"
| 1
| March 27
| Fort Wayne
| W 93–79
| George Mikan (24)
| George Mikan (4)
| Minneapolis Auditorium
| 1–0
|- align="center" bgcolor="#ccffcc"
| 2
| March 28
| @ Fort Wayne
| W 89–82
| George Mikan (37)
| —
| North Side High School Gym
| 2–0
|-

|- align="center" bgcolor="#ccffcc"
| 1
| April 5
| Anderson
| W 75–50
| George Mikan (26)
| Jim Pollard (5)
| Minneapolis Auditorium
| 1–0
|- align="center" bgcolor="#ccffcc"
| 2
| April 6
| @ Anderson
| W 90–71
| George Mikan (32)
| —
| Anderson High School Wigwam
| 2–0
|-

|- align="center" bgcolor="#ccffcc" 
| 1
| April 8
| @ Syracuse
| W 68–66
| George Mikan (37)
| —
| State Fair Coliseum7,552
| 1–0
|- align="center" bgcolor="#ffcccc" 
| 2
| April 9
| @ Syracuse
| L 85–91
| George Mikan (32)
| —
| State Fair Coliseum8,280
| 1–1
|- align="center" bgcolor="#ccffcc" 
| 3
| April 14
| Syracuse
| W 91–77
| George Mikan (28)
| George Mikan (8)
| St. Paul Auditorium10,288
| 2–1
|- align="center" bgcolor="#ccffcc" 
| 4
| April 16
| Syracuse
| W 77–69
| George Mikan (28)
| Jim Pollard (4)
| St. Paul Auditorium10,512
| 3–1
|- align="center" bgcolor="#ffcccc" 
| 5
| April 20
| @ Syracuse
| L 76–83
| George Mikan (28)
| —
| State Fair Coliseum9,024
| 3–2
|- align="center" bgcolor="#ccffcc" 
| 6
| April 23
| Syracuse
| W 110–95
| George Mikan (40)
| Jim Pollard (10)
| Minneapolis Auditorium9,812
| 4–2
|-

Awards and honors
George Mikan, All-NBA First Team
Jim Pollard, All-NBA First Team

References

Minneapolis
Los Angeles Lakers seasons
NBA championship seasons
Minnesota Lakers
Minnesota Lakers